Baldassare Gabbugiani was an Italian engraver. He executed some of the plates for the Museo Fiorentino, published at Florence between the years 1747 and 1766.

References

Artists from Florence
Italian engravers
Year of birth unknown
Year of death unknown